Atkinson friction factor is a measure of the resistance to airflow of a duct. It is widely used in the mine ventilation industry but is rarely referred to outside of it.

Atkinson friction factor is represented by the symbol  and has the same units as air density (kilograms per cubic metre in SI units, lbfmin^2/ft^4 in Imperial units).  It is related to the more widespread Fanning friction factor by

It is related to the Darcy friction factor by 

It was introduced by John J Atkinson in an early mathematical treatment of mine ventilation (1862) and has been known under his name ever since.

See also

 Atkinson resistance

References

 NCB Mining Dept., Ventilation in coal mines: a handbook for colliery ventilation officers,  National Coal Board 1979.

Further reading
 1999 paper giving the derivation of 
 Atkinson, J J, Gases met with in Coal Mines, and the general principles of Ventilation Transactions of the Manchester Geological Society, Vol. III, p.218, 1862

Fluid dynamics
Mine ventilation